For the Texas politician, see Raul Torres (Texas politician)

Raul Montes Torres (b. Botucatu, Sao Paulo, July 11, 1906 - d. July 12, 1970) was a Brazilian caipira artist.

Torres came from a family of poor Spanish immigrants. His first appearance on Brazilian radio was in 1927 on Rádio Educadora Paulista and Rádio Cruzeiro do Sul; that same year, he made his first recordings on Brasilphone, with the songs "Segura o Coco, Maria" b/w "Verde e Amarelo." As his fame grew in Brazil, Torres assembled a group, Raul Torres e sua Embaixada, and toured Paraguay in 1935, and again in 1944 and 1950; he became the principal reason for the increased popularity of caipira in that country. A star in Rio de Janeiro, Torres recorded profusely in the 1930s and 1940s, recording with João Pacífico, Lamartine Babo, Francisco Alves, Sílvio Caldas, Jaime Vogeler, Noel Rosa, and Moreira da Silva. From 1937 to 1942, Torres recorded with his nephew, Antenor Serra; among their releases were the Brazilian hit singles "Cigana," "Meu Cavalo Zaino," and "Boiada Cuiabana." After this, Torres recorded with Florêncio (João Baptista Pinto).

Torres recorded 456 songs before his death in 1970, and songs that he sang or wrote were covered frequently by other caipira musicians. His music profoundly influenced the development of sertanejo music; the genre's most prominent exponents, such as Leandro e Leonardo and Chitãozinho e Xororó, have all recorded songs written by Torres.

References
[ Raul Torres] at Allmusic.com

1906 births
1970 deaths
Brazilian people of Spanish descent
Musicians from São Paulo (state)
20th-century Brazilian male singers
20th-century Brazilian singers
People from Botucatu